Brisco is an English surname. It derives either from Brisco in Cumbria or Briscoe in County Durham. Notable people with the surname include: 

Brisco baronets in Great Britain
Gerald Brisco (born 1946), American wrestler
Jack Brisco (1941–2010), American wrestler, brother of Gerald, uncle of Wes
John Brisco Ray (1902–1973), English diver
Khai Brisco (born 2000), American soccer player
Mikiah Brisco (born 1996), American sprint runner
Musgrave Brisco (1791–1854), British Conservative politician
Neil Brisco (born 1978), English football player
Robert Brisco (1928–2004), Canadian politician
Robert Brisco Earée (1846–1928), English priest and philatelist
Valerie Brisco-Hooks (born 1960), American sprint runner
Wes Brisco (born 1983), American wrestler, son of Gerald

See also
Briscoe (surname)

References